Paul Annacone and Christo van Rensburg were the defending champions, but lost in the semifinals to Swedes and top seeds Stefan Edberg and Anders Järryd.

Edberg and Järryd won the 1987 Australian Open men's doubles tennis tournament, defeating home players Peter Doohan and Laurie Warder in the final 6–4, 6–4, 7–6(7–3).

Seeds
All seeds receive a bye into the second round.

Draw

Finals

Top half

Section 1

Section 2

Bottom half

Section 3

Section 4

References

External links
 1987 Australian Open – Men's draws and results at the International Tennis Federation

Men's Doubles
1987 in Australian tennis
1987